Pejman Azarmina (Persian: پژمان آذرمینا, born in 1973) is an Iranian-American scholar, entrepreneur, musician and thinkocrat.  After 15 years of pursuing a career in the pharmaceutical industry (most of which being at Pfizer), he joined UCLA as a faculty member to establish the Office of Physician-Scientist Career Development within the David Geffen School of Medicine. Earlier in his career, his interest in leadership development led to the formation of multiple tools, projects and initiatives aiming to develop the next generation of holistic leaders and systems thinkers under the umbrella term of Thinkocrats.

Azarmina published Common Medical Terms, an evidence-based medical dictionary, in 1995 as a student project leading a team of seven editors and 22 term-finders, which was recognized as the best student book in 1997. In 2001, he authored six bestselling titles named "My Doctor" describing medical topics in plain language for the public.  In 2017, he co-authored the Sexuality Education Wheel of Context that introduces a "context analysis" practical framework for change agents working in sexuality education.

Azarmina is also a concert musician and santour instructor. He has released 5 music albums, published two sheet music and wrote three chapters of Love Dynasty, a multimedia encyclopedia for Persian Music. His first solo album, Old Persian Dances, was released in 1996 and contained novel rearrangements of old dance forms from the original repertoire for Persian music. His next album, Shabdiz, contained a collection of his compositions for solo and two santours. Azarmina's next albums, Persian Nostalgia and Rebellious Solitude, were released in the US and contained fine renderings of some Persian music masterpieces and advanced repertoire for the santoor. His latest album is a full performance of master Payvar's advanced repertoire for the Santour  with video recordings available on his YouTube channel.

Azarmina had also been involved in philanthropic activities by being the Vice-Chair of Leadership and Professional Development Forum at Public Affairs Alliance of Iranian Americans (PAAIA) NexGen NY and by developing and offering several leadership and professional development programs and workshop for young and talented Iranian-Americans in New York and California.

Early life and education
Azarmina was born in Tehran, Iran; started studying the santour at age 11 with Master Faramarz Payvar (1933‒2009) and graduated from his private class after completing the 'Advanced Repertoire for the Santour' (Persian: ردیف چپ کوک) in 1994.   His other music teachers include Hossein Dehlavi (music theory, harmony and songwriting) and Ahmad Pejman (composition and counterpoint).

Azarmina's style of performance is perhaps one of the closest to that of late Master Payvar, yet his interpretation of Persian music is very lean, expressive, and contemporary.

Azarmina studied medicine at Tehran University of Medical Sciences (1992‒1999), completed a master's degree in Healthcare Management at University of Surrey (2003‒2005) and obtained a graduate certificate in Medical Informatics from Oregon Health & Science University (2007) and a certificate in coaching from New York University (2011).

Discography 
 1994 Dialogue (Persian: گفتگو) [a collaborative album featuring all duets composed by Faramarz Payvar]
 1996 Old Persian Dances (Persian: رنگهای هفت دستگاه), ASIN B002I51ARW
 2000 Shabdiz (Persian: شبدیز)
 2011 Rebellious Solitude UPC 884501559584, ASIN B005E8KXI2
 2011 Persian Nostalgia UPC 884501559577, ASIN B005E8KUPI
 2011 Shabdiz [remastered] UPC 885767798878, ASIN B005F9VP5U
 2020 Chapkook Advanced Repertoire for the Santour (Persian: ردیف چپ کوک استاد پایور) UPC 195079442735

Books 
 1996 Common Medical Terms (Persian: واژه های زبانزد پزشکی)
 2000 Old Persian Dances (Persian: رنگهای هفت دستگاه) 
 2000 Shabdiz 
 2000 Basic Epidemiology 
 2001 My Doctor (nervous system diseases) 
 2001 My Doctor (blood diseases and cancer) 
 2001 My Doctor (kidney diseases) 
 2001 My Doctor (heart diseases) 
 2001 My Doctor (joint and autoimmune diseases) 
 2001 My Doctor (infectious diseases) 
 2017 Sexuality Education Wheel of Context (a guide for sexuality educators, advocates and researchers) 
 2020 Thinkocrats Country Comps: Classic Edition, US Version 
 2020 Addenda to Santour's Method (Persian: حاشیه دستور سنتور)

Selected Scientific Papers 
 Ladapo JA, Budoff MJ, Azarmina P, et al. Economic Outcomes of a Precision Medicine Blood Test To Assess Obstructive Coronary Artery Disease: Results From the PRESET Registry. Manag Care. 2018;27(6):34‐40. 
 Azarmina P, Prestwich G, Rosenquist J, Singh D. Transferring disease management and health promotion programs to other countries: critical success factors. Health Promot Int. 2008 Dec;23(4):372-9. Epub 2008 Sep 22. 
 Azarmina P, Lewis J. Patient satisfaction with a nurse-led, telephone-based disease management service in Birmingham. J Telemed Telecare. 2007; 13(suppl 1):3-4 
 Azarmina P, Wallace P. Remote interpretation in medical encounters: a systematic review. J Telemed Telecare. 2005;11(3):140-5. 
 Samuel M, Coombes JC, Miranda JJ, Melvin R, Young EJ, Azarmina P. Assessing computer skills in Tanzanian medical students: an elective experience. BMC Public Health. 2004 Aug 12;4:37. 
 Malekzadeh R, Mokri A, Azarmina P. Medical science and research in Iran. Arch Irn Med 2001; 4(1): 27–39.

Other Creative Works
 Thinkocrats Country Comps, an educational card game about countries around the world 
 Thinkocrats State Comps, an educational card game about 50 States in the US 
 Thinkocrats City Comps, an educational card game about 52 cities across the globe 
 Thinkocrats Car Comps, an educational card game about 52 popular or attractive cars 
 Relationship Panoramic Inventory, a battery of validated scales and tools for couples to assess their relationship health.

References

External links 
 Thinkocrats
 Official Website of Pejman Azarmina
 Artist Page on CD Baby
 Author Page on Amazon.com
 Music Videos on YouTube
 

1973 births
Living people
Physicians from Tehran
Oregon Health & Science University alumni
Alumni of the University of Surrey